Illinois Route 89 (IL 89) is a  rural, north–south state highway in central Illinois. It runs from U.S. Route 34 (US 34) in La Moille southward to IL 116 in Metamora.   IL 26 and IL 89 are the main north–south roads between Interstate 39 (I-39)/US 51 and IL 29.

Route description 

Starting at La Moille, IL 89 travels south and passes through the small towns of Arlington, Cherry, and Ladd, where it crosses I-80. After passing Spring Valley and crossing the Illinois River, IL 89 crosses IL 71 near Granville, then passes through McNabb. After crossing IL 18 in Magnolia and IL 17 at Varna, it then passes through LaRose and Washburn as only state highway in those two towns. It becomes North Niles Street in Metamora and ends at Mount Vernon Street, IL 116.

History 

SBI Route 89 originally ran from Dixon to Metamora along Illinois Route 26 and Illinois 71. It was truncated north at Granville in 1938 and rerouted to La Moille.

The highway's crossing of the Illinois River in Spring Valley was replaced with a new bridge that opened on June 18, 2018. The former bridge was imploded.

Major intersections

References

External links

089
Illinois Route 089
Illinois Route 089
Illinois Route 089
Illinois Route 089